Emam Mohammad Bagher is a high school located in Isfahan, Iran. It is the main branch of the Emam Mohammad Bagher Higher Education Institute, consisting of several elementary and high schools in Isfahan.

See also
Dar ol-Fonoon
Education in Iran
Higher education in Iran
Razi High School

References

External links
Facebook page

Schools in Isfahan
Educational institutions established in 1980
High schools in Iran